A double-contrast barium enema is a form of contrast radiography in which x-rays of the colon and rectum are taken using two forms of contrast to make the structures easier to see. A liquid containing barium (that is, a radiocontrast agent) is put into the rectum. Barium is a silver-white metallic compound that outlines the colon and rectum on an x-ray and helps show abnormalities. Air is also put into the rectum and colon to further enhance the x-ray.

Double-contrast barium enemas are less invasive than a colonoscopy and have comparatively fewer issues in a viable large bowel.

See also 
 Contrast agent
 Lower gastrointestinal series

References

External links 
 Double-contrast barium enema entry in the public domain NCI Dictionary of Cancer Terms

Projectional radiography
Digestive system imaging